Don and the Goodtimes were an American garage rock band, formed in Portland, Oregon, United States, in 1964. Fronted by Don Gallucci, former keyboardist of the Kingsmen, the group made a name for itself in the Northwest rock scene performing in a similar style as their contemporaries the Wailers and the Sonics. Over time, Don and the Goodtimes honed their vocal harmonies and earned two hits on the Billboard Hot 100 in 1967, including their biggest hit "I Could Be So Good to You". The band released their album, So Good, and later experimented with psychedelia under the moniker Touch before disbanding in 1969.

History
Don Galluci (keyboards) was immersed in the Northwest rock scene early on as a member of the Kingsmen. He enjoyed early success with the band when they released the national hit, "Louie Louie", which features him playing the song's signature keyboard riff. However, Gallucci—just 15 years of age—was deemed too young to tour in support of the record and resigned from the group in early 1964. Gallucci formed his own band with Bobby Holden, a drummer he started jamming with at a nightclub called the Chase. Members from Holden's former band, the Invaders, joined the project, including Dave Child (bass guitar) and Don McKinney (saxophone, vocals). Ex-Kingsmen Jack Ely (vocals) performed with the group—albeit briefly—and Pierre Ouellette (lead guitar), a former guitarist for Paul Revere and the Raiders, rounded-out the original Don and the Goodtimes line-up.

Thanks to Gallucci's connections in the music industry, the group was quickly signed by record producer Jerry Dennon of Jerden Records — the same producer of early Kingsmen recordings. The band traveled to Audio Recording Studio in Seattle to cover "Turn On", an instrumental piece that was garnering success for several local teen rock groups. "Turn On" was released on the A-side of the band's debut single and received airplay in the Northwest. Holden described Don and the Goodtimes early success: "We went on the road backing up this record and got some local airplay! We were an interesting band because we had these R&B roots but at the same time we realized that kids really liked show bands — like Paul Revere and the Raiders — so we amalgamated the two". For live performances, Don and the Goodtimes chose distinguishable attire—typically sporting suits and top hats. In 1965, after releasing their second single "Big Big Knight (On a Big White Horse)", Jim Valley of the Viceroys was brought in to replace Ouellette and occasionally share lead vocals with McKinney.

Valley's role as a songwriter proved invaluable to the band on their next record, as he penned its A-side "Little Sally Tease". It furthered Don and the Goodtimes' popularity, and was covered by contemporaries such as the Standells and the Kingsmen. In mid-1965, the band was signed to Dunhill Records, and "Little Sally Tease" was released nationally. In 1966, the group made television appearances on the Lloyd Thaxton Show and Hollywood a-Go-Go, before commencing weekly performances on Dick Clark's show Where the Action Is. An album named after the program was recorded in the same year, and featured mainly renditions of popular tunes in the Northwest, including "Money (That's What I Want)", "The Witch", and "Jolly Green Giant". Commenting on Don and the Goodtimes' gritty R&B style, music critic Doug Shepherd wrote they "were one of the most adventurous bands in the region", and "perhaps the only band to cover 'The Witch' in a manner that did justice to the Sonics’ original".

Accepting an offer to join Paul Revere and the Raiders, Valley departed Don and the Goodtimes, and was replaced by Charlie Coe, another Raiders alumnus. Child and McKinney also left the band, and were substituted by Rob "Buzz" Overman and Jeff Hawks respectively. In 1967, the group settled in Los Angeles and began rehearsing their vocal harmonies in preparation for their next album. About this time Charlie Coe returned to the Raiders and was replaced by guitarist Joey Newman from the Northwest band The Liberty Tree. Joining them for recording was Jack Nitzsche, who produced and arranged the album, and A-list session musicians Ry Cooder, Glen Campbell, and Hal Blaine. The album, titled So Good, was released on Epic Records, and charted at 102 nationally on the Billboard 200. Its supporting single "I Could Be So Good to You" reached number 56 on the Billboard Hot 100, but fared better on Los Angeles's regional market, where it reached number 15. A non-album single "Happy and Me" was a minor hit, peaking at number 98.

Don and the Goodtimes released three more singles in 1968, none of which managed to continue their success. Overman and Holden departed the group later in the year, effectively disbanding the band. Gallucci formed another band with Hawks and Newman and new members Bruce Hauser, (bass guitar, vocals) and John Bordonaro (drums, vocals), naming it Touch. Refashioning themselves as a psychedelic rock troupe, Touch released one self-titled album in 1969. The group—unable to replicate their complex studio sound—refused to tour in support of the album, and, as a result, sales were poor. Touch disbanded soon after. Gallucci went on to become a successful record producer, working most notably on the Stooges' second album Fun House, in 1970.

References

1964 establishments in Oregon
Garage rock groups from Oregon
Musical groups established in 1964
Musical groups disestablished in 1968
Musical groups from Portland, Oregon
Epic Records artists
Wand Records artists